The men's discus throw event at the 2006 Commonwealth Games was held on March 21–23.

Medalists

Results

Qualification
Qualification: 60.00 m (Q) or at least 12 best (q) qualified for the final.

Final

References
Results

Discus
2006